Greg Wood may refer to:

Greg Wood (actor), British actor
Greg Wood (cricketer) (born 1988), English cricketer
Greg Wood (footballer) (born 1953), Australian footballer for Melbourne
Greg Wood (guitarist), former guitarist for the band Punchline
Greg Wood (magician), Canadian magician
Greg Wood (racing driver), racing driver who competed in the 2009 Pickup Truck Racing season